Anel Alexander (née Flett) is an actress and producer from Pretoria, South Africa.

Career 
In high school, Alexander won the best supporting actress in the ATKV teen acting competition. After playing Liezl in 7de Laan, she starred in the romantic comedies Semi-Soet and Klein Karoo.

In 2013, she starred in an Afrikaans drama series called Geraamtes in die kas. Later that year, she won the kykNET Silwerskermfees award for best supporting actress for her role in Faan Se Trein. Alexander has starred in the 2008 film Discreet alongside her husband James Alexander.

References 

1979 births
Living people
South African film actresses
South African soap opera actresses
People from Pretoria
20th-century South African actresses
21st-century South African actresses